Ashlyn Rae Willson (born April 24, 1993), better known as Ashe, is an American singer and songwriter. She is best known for her 2019 single "Moral of the Story", which was featured in the Netflix film To All the Boys: P.S. I Still Love You (2020) and was produced by Noah Conrad with additional production from Finneas O'Connell. Ashe also co-wrote Demi Lovato's 2017 single "You Don't Do It for Me Anymore" and has toured with Louis the Child, Lauv and Whethan. She was nominated for a Juno Award for her gold-certified single "Let You Get Away" with Shaun Frank. Her debut studio album Ashlyn was released on May 7, 2021. Her second album, Rae, was released on October 14, 2022.

Early life
Ashlyn Rae Willson was born on April 24, 1993, in San Jose, California. She began attending piano and vocal lessons at the age of 8. Ashe says that she grew up listening only to Christian radio and that she thanks her grandfather for introducing her to music from names like Bob Dylan, The Beatles and Jefferson Airplane. She attended Berklee College of Music and graduated with a major in contemporary writing and production in 2015.

Career

2015–2017: Early career 
Ashe started out by singing demos in Nashville before catching the attention of Swedish deep house producer Ben Phipps, who asked her to sing on his track "Sleep Alone" in 2015. Over the next two years, Ashe specialized in appearing on a number of dance and house tracks from names like Louis the Child and Whethan. Her 2016 single "Can't Hide" with Whethan was her fifth No. 2 on both the US and Global Spotify Viral 50 charts. Her 2017 single "Let You Get Away" with Canadian DJ Shaun Frank was nominated for Dance Recording of the Year at the 2017 Juno Awards and was certified gold in Canada in 2019. Ashe assisted Demi Lovato in composing her 2017 single "You Don't Do It For Me Any More" from their US platinum-certified album Tell Me You Love Me (2017). Between October 2017 and January 2018, Ashe embarked on tours with Louis the Child, Lauv, and Whethan. After signing to Mom + Pop independent label, she released her debut single "Used to It" in June 2017 and "Girl Who Cried Wolf" in November 2017. "Used to It" was her second single to reach No. 1 on the Global Spotify Viral 50 chart. Ashe was placed alongside Billie Eilish and Lewis Capaldi on Vevo's list of Artists to Watch in 2018. Throughout April 2017, Ashe supported The Chainsmokers during their Memories Do Not Open Tour and performed onstage with Big Gigantic during Coachella Festival 2017.

2018–2020: The Rabbit Hole EP & Moral of the Story 

By the time Ashe had released her debut EP, The Rabbit Hole, in June 2018, she had clocked over 200 million accumulative streams and nine No. 1 songs on Hype Machine. The EP was described as "a versatile and compelling seven-track affair." Ashe supported Quinn XCII on his From Michigan with Love World Tour, during which she also released her single "Moral of the Story".

On April 5, 2019, Ashe released the four-track EP, Moral of the Story: Chapter 1, which Finneas O'Connell entirely produced. O'Connell also produced three of the four tracks on her sequel EP, Moral of the Story: Chapter 2.

In February 2020, the single "Moral of the Story" was used in the Netflix teen rom-com To All the Boys: P.S. I Still Love You (2020), which caused the song to reach number 2 on both Global and US Spotify Viral 50 chart. Ashe made her debut chart appearance on the Billboard Hot 100 with "Moral of the Story" and the Billboard 200 with Moral of the Story: Chapter 1. Ashe also released a duet of "Moral of the Story" featuring Niall Horan. As of June 2020, the single has been used in over 901,400 videos on the online platform TikTok. As of September 2022, her collaboration with Niall Horan has reached over 160 million streams on Spotify.

2021: Ashlyn 
In March 2021, Ashe released another song with O'Connell titled "Till Forever Falls Apart". Her debut album Ashlyn was released on May 7, 2021, including the songs "I'm Fine" and "When I'm Older" issued prior to the album, along with "Me Without You", released on May 5. Ashlyn debuted at number 194 on the Billboard 200 dated May 22, 2021.

2022–present: Rae 
On March 3, 2022, Ashe released the single "Another Man's Jeans" after releasing snippets of the song on social media. Ashe released another single, "Hope You're Not Happy" on May 6, 2022.

Three months after her song, "Hope You're Not Happy" released. She returned to her "home", which is the Bay Area in San Francisco as was set to perform exclusively at Outside Lands Music and Arts Festival on the 6th of August.

The day of the 6th she performed at the Twin Peaks stage at 3:45 pm. She sung a few of her singles off her, new Rae such as, "Angry Woman", "Shower With My Clothes on", and "Another Man's Jeans" off her album that would release a two months after. During her set she also sang, "Somebody To Love" by Queen (band)

Soon after, Ashe announced her second studio album, Rae, on June 22, 2022, the same day that she released the song "Angry Woman". The album was released on October 14, 2022.

Before the release of the album, Ashe released three more of its songs; "Shower with My Clothes On" on July 29, "Emotional" on August 26, and "OMW" along with its music video on October 12, 2022.

On November 4, 2022 she released a single with Stephen Sanchez, titled "Missing You" with a duration of 3 minutes and 55 seconds.

Artistry 
Ashe says that jazz music, Diane Keaton, and Carole King are major influences and inspirations to her own music. Ashe put an "e" on her stagename to pay homage to Carole King. Artists she admires are Stevie Nicks, Carole King, John Mayer, Justin Vernon and Bon Iver.

Discography

Studio albums

Extended plays

Singles

As lead artist

As featured artist

Songwriting credits

References

External links

 

Living people
Berklee College of Music alumni
21st-century American women singers
Musicians from San Jose, California
1993 births
Singers from Los Angeles
American women singer-songwriters
Mom + Pop Music artists
Singer-songwriters from California